The 1999 Queensland Cup season was the 4th season of Queensland's top-level statewide rugby league competition.

The competition was contested by fourteen teams over a 26-week long season (including finals), with the Burleigh defeating the Redcliffe Dolphins 12–10 in the grand final at Suncorp Stadium. Redcliffe  Mick Roberts was named the competition's Player of the Year.

Teams 
The number of teams in the competition was reduced from 16 to 12 for the 1999 season. Brisbane Brothers, Bundaberg Grizzlies, Gold Coast Vikings and Townsville Stingers were all withdrawn. Brothers and Bundaberg both competed in the inaugural season of the Queensland Cup, while Townsville and the Vikings both played just one season.

For the 1999 season, the Brisbane Broncos were affiliated with the Toowoomba Clydesdales, the Melbourne Storm with the Norths Devils and the North Queensland Cowboys with the Cairns Cyclones and Wests Panthers. The Auckland Warriors also used Souths Magpies and Wynnum Seagulls as feeder clubs, sending them up to four players each round.

Ladder

Finals series

Grand final 

Burleigh qualified for their first grand final after a comeback win over Norths in the minor semi-finals and with a six-point win over Redcliffe a week later. Redcliffe, who finished as minor premiers for the first time and earned a first week bye, were forced into a preliminary final with Norths after losing to the Bears. The Dolphins held on for a four-point victory to book their third grand final appearance in five years.

First half 
After Burleigh kicked a penalty goal inside the opening minute, it took 20 minutes for the first try of the game to be scored, with Bears' centre Darren Anderson crossing out wide. With six minutes to play in the first half, Dolphins' centre Mixie Lui put his winger Trent Leis into gap to score. Leis missed the ensuing conversion leaving his side trailing by four points at half time.

Second half 
Redcliffe opened the second half with a penalty goal from right in front after Burleigh prop Tony Priddle was penalised. 10 minutes later, the Dolphins nabbed their second try when winger Ricky Hewinson scored in the corner, courtesy of a Tony Gould cutout pass. Leis failed to convert but Redcliffe had their first lead, 10–8, with 18 minutes remaining. Burleigh regained the lead shortly after when fullback Jamie Mahon scored what would be the game-winning try. A tense final 10 minutes followed but Burleigh hung on to claim their first premiership in their third season in the Queensland Cup.

Burleigh winger Aaron Douglas, who was stretchered off during the game, became the first player to win two Queensland Cup grand finals, winning his first with Redcliffe two years earlier.

Player statistics

Leading try scorers

Leading point scorers

End-of-season awards 
 Courier Mail Medal: Mick Roberts ( Redcliffe Dolphins)
 Rookie of the Year: David Seage ( Wynnum Seagulls)

See also 

 Queensland Cup
 Queensland Rugby League

References 

1999 in Australian rugby league
Queensland Cup